International economic law is an increasingly seminal field of international law that involves the regulation and conduct of states, international organizations, and private firms operating in the international economic arena. As such, international economic law encompasses a broad range of disciplines touching on public international law, private international law, and domestic law applicable to international business transactions.

For several decades, international economic law was most often associated with international trade, largely due to the fact that trade had developed the most mature multilateral legal institutions (e.g. the GATT and later WTO) for governing international commerce.  Today, however, a range of disciplines are routinely acknowledged as being as impactful and relevant to the field, including:
 International monetary law;
 International financial regulation (including banking, derivatives, insurance and securities regulation);
 International development;
 International labor and services law;
 International investment law, including international commercial arbitration;
 International intellectual property law;
 International tax law;
 International environmental law;
 Sovereign debt and restructuring.

Because of the breadth of international economic activities and transactions, international economic law is a highly interdisciplinary field of study.  Decisions in one area, such as tax or financial regulation, can impact the transmission of monetary policy, which can, in turn, impact the effectiveness or operation of a trade regime, and vice versa.  Consequently, a wide range of notable governmental and intergovernmental organizations are involved in formulating international economic law and policy.  Among the most important are:
 National finance ministries, trade officials, and financial market supervisors;
 Multilateral institutions including the IMF, WTO, Bank for International Settlements, IFC, World Bank, EU, ILO, United Nations, and European Commission;
 “Minilateral” institutions associated with regional and bilateral trade, IP, financial regulatory accords, and other targeted diplomatic efforts.

Following research popularized in the 1990s by scholars in international law, political science, international relations, and commercial law, academic institutions have become increasingly engaged in the study of the international economic law.  Among the most notable are:
 The University of Zurich, which offers an LLM in International Business Law;
 Georgetown University Law Center, which hosts the Institute of International Economic Law, publishes the Journal of International Economic Law, and offers a joint J.D./L.L.M. in International Business and Economic Law;
 The University of Hong Kong's Asian Institute of International Financial Law;
 Stanford Law School, which offers an LLM in International Economic Law, Business & Policy;
 Tufts University Fletcher School, a Graduate School of International Affairs;
 Stetson University and Toulouse University, which offer a joint dual degree program with a Master in International Economic Law;
 New York University Law School, which offers LLMs in International Business Regulation, International Legal Studies, and International Taxation, and hosts the Hauser Global Law School Program;
 Warwick University School of Law, which offers an LLM in International Economic Law;
 The University of Edinburgh Law School, which offers an LLM in International Economic Law;
 The University of Lausanne, which offers an LLM specializing in International and European Economic and Commercial Law;
The University of New South Wales in Sydney, Australia, which offers an LLM specialising in International Business and Economic Law;
The University of Heidelberg and University of Chile, which offer a joint Master of Laws in International Law (LL.M.), Investments, Trade and Arbitration;
 Kent Law School, which offers an LLM programme in International Economic Law at its Brussels campus and an LLM programme in International Commercial Law (which includes modules on IEL topics) at its Canterbury UK campus;
 The International Economic Law and Policy LL.M. Programme (IELPO), based in Barcelona, Spain;
 The University of Antwerp, which is establishing a PhD programme in international economic law with structured training and collaboration with the World Trade Institute;
 The Graduate Institute of International and Development Studies, Geneva, which offers an LL.M. in International Law and includes a specialty stream in International Economic Law;
 The World Trade Institute of the University of Bern, which hosts the one-year Master programme MILE focusing on the legal, economic and international relations perspectives of international trade regulation;
 The University of Ottawa Faculty of Law offers an LL.M. with concentration in International Trade and Investment Law;
 Bocconi University in Milan, Italy, which offers a Phd in Legal Studies (International Law and Economics).
 Birkbeck College, University of London, which offers an LLM in International Economic Law Justice and Development

Additionally, a number of think tanks and not-for-profit organizations contribute to scholarship on international economic law, including:
 Atlantic Council
 Washington International Trade Association
 Americans for Financial Reform
 British Institute of International and Comparative Law
 Cato Institute
 Inter-American Bar Association
 Milken Institute
 Peterson Institute
 Salzburg Seminar
 American Society of International Law
 Institute for International Monetary Affairs
 Society of International Economic Law

External links
Georgetown University Law Center Institute of International Economic Law
Georgetown University Law Center Journal of International Economic Law 
Journal of International Economic Law (Oxford Univ. Press)
 Society of International Economic Law
The European Institute for International Law and International Relations

References

Economic law
International development
International environmental law